Sandro Carlos Sotilli (born 18 August 1973) is a Brazilian retired footballer.

He retired as the top scorer in Campeonato Gaúcho history with 111 goals.

References

Living people
1973 births
Brazilian footballers
Association football forwards
Esporte Clube Pelotas players
Esporte Clube Juventude players
Esporte Clube São Luiz players
Associação Chapecoense de Futebol players
Esporte Clube São José players
Sport Club Internacional players
Club Necaxa footballers
Chiapas F.C. footballers
Dorados de Sinaloa footballers
Club León footballers
Liga MX players
Brazilian expatriate footballers
Brazilian expatriate sportspeople in China
Brazilian expatriate sportspeople in Mexico
Expatriate footballers in China
Expatriate footballers in Mexico
Sportspeople from Rio Grande do Sul